The Headies 2016 was the 11th edition of The Headies. It was held on December 22, 2016, at the Eko Convention Centre in Victoria Island, Lagos. Themed "Think, Create, Recreate", the event was hosted by Adesua Etomi and Falz. The nominees were announced by the award's organizers in November 2016. Tekno was nominated for the Next Rated award, but ended up being disqualified due to his refusal to honour the category and support the campaign. Jazzman Olofin and Adewale Ayuba jointly performed the song "Raise the Roof". Aramide performed her song "Funmi Lowo" with assistance from Ras Kimono. The ceremony also featured additional performances from Falz, 2Baba, Seyi Shay and Flavour. Olamide received eight nominations and won a total of four, including Best Rap Single for his single "Eyan Mayweather". Mr Eazi won the Next Rated category and was awarded a SUV at a later date. Mayorkun toppled Dice Ailes and Koker for the Rookie of the Year award. Laolu Akins was honored with the Hall of Fame award, while Flavour received the Special Recognition award.

Performances

Presenters 
Helen Paul – presented the award for Best Street Hop Artiste
Zaki Adzay – presented the award for Best Reggae/Dancehall Single
Osagie Alonge and Toni Tones – presented the award for Best Alternative Song
Uti Nwachukwu and Adunni Ade – presented the award for Best Pop Single
Sarah Ofili and DJ Obi – presented the award for Best R&B Single
Mai Atafo and Adedoja Allen – presented the award for Producer of the Year
Kcee and Harrysong – presented the award for Best Recording of the Year
Eva Alordiah and Yaw – presented the award for Lyricist on the Roll
Ali Baba – presented the Hall of Fame award
Toke Makinwa and Ubi Franklin – presented the award for Best Rap Single
Sound Sultan and Ushbebe – presented the award for Best Rap Album
Osas Ighodaro and Gbenro Ajibade – presented the award for Best Pop Album
2Baba – presented the award for Hip Hop World Revelation of the Year
Funke Akindele and Lolo1 – presented the award for Best Collabo
Darey and Lami Philips – presented the Song of the Year award
Ayo Makun and Mr. Arogundade – presented the Next Rated award
Bovi – presented the award for Album of the Year
Kenny Ogungbe and AFRIMA director – presented the Special Recognition award

Winners and nominees

References

The Headies